Sergi Bruguera was the defending champion but was forced to retire in the final losing 7–5, 3–0 against Jordi Arrese.

Seeds

  Sergi Bruguera (final)
  Francisco Clavet (semifinals)
  Jordi Arrese (champion)
  Javier Sánchez (semifinals)
  Guillermo Pérez Roldán (first round)
  Gabriel Markus (first round)
  Magnus Gustafsson (quarterfinals)
  Marcelo Filippini (first round)

Draw

Finals

Top half

Bottom half

External links
 Main draw

1992 ATP Tour
ATP Athens Open